Tebi, also known by the village name Dubu, is a Western Pauwasi language of West New Guinea. It is spoken in Affi, Dubu, and Jembatan Web villages of Keerom Regency. It is mostly used by older adults.

A survey report has been carried out by Im (2005).

Basic vocabulary
Below are some basic vocabulary words in Tebi.

{| 
|+ Tebi basic vocabulary
| ‘I’ || na
|-
| ‘you (sg)’ || fro
|-
| ‘we’ || numu
|-
| ‘belly’ || dialə
|-
| ‘bird’ || olmu
|-
| ‘black’ || təŋəra
|-
| ‘blood’ || təri
|-
| ‘breast’ || mamu
|-
| ‘come’ || kəlawai
|-
| ‘eat’ || ne
|-
| ‘eye’ || ei
|-
| ‘foot’ || puŋwa
|-
| ‘give’ || taʔa
|-
| ‘good’ || pani
|-
| ‘hand’ || təro
|-
| ‘head’ || məndini
|-
| ‘hear’ || fei
|-
| ‘house’ || 
|-
| ‘louse’ || mi
|-
| ‘man’ || toŋkwar
|-
| ‘mosquito’ || mimi
|-
| ‘name’ || kini
|-
| ‘road’ || fiaʔa
|-
| ‘root’ || periŋgu
|-
| ‘sand’ || tədən
|-
| ‘tooth’ || kle
|-
| ‘tree’ || weyalgi
|-
| ‘water’ || ai
|-
| ‘who’ || mate
|-
| ‘one’ || kərowali
|-
| ‘two’ || kre
|}

References

Tebi–Towe languages
Languages of western New Guinea